Dolly Varden may refer to:

 Dolly Varden (character), a character in the 1841 novel Barnaby Rudge by Charles Dickens

Aquatic species
 Dolly Varden trout, Salvelinus malma malma, a fish found in coastal waters of the North Pacific
 Southern Dolly Varden, Salvelinus malma krascheninnikova, a subspecies of migrating fish
 Dolly Varden crab, Hepatus epheliticus, a colorful marine crab
 Dolly Varden, a local name for the Bull trout, Salvelinus confluentus

Places
 the mine associated with the settlement of Kitsault, British Columbia
 Dolly Varden, Ohio, a community in the United States
 Dolly Varden Mountains, a mountain range in Elko County, Nevada

Other uses
 Dolly Vardens (baseball team), a name adopted by a number of 19th century baseball clubs
 Dolly Vardens (political party), a California Anti-Monopoly Party, electing Newton Booth to the U.S. Senate
 Dolly Varden (band), a musical group from Chicago, Illinois
 Dolly Varden (costume), a style of dressing popular in the late 19th century
 Dolly Varden, a boat of the Wellington Rowing Club
 Dolly Varden (yacht), a racing yacht built 1872 now under restoration
 Dolly Varden Line, nickname of the Chicago, Attica and Southern Railroad in Indiana
Dolly Varden, a 1913 Edison film